Exeter  is a village in the Southern Highlands district of New South Wales, Australia, in Wingecarribee Shire.  It has a station on the Main Southern railway line south of Sydney.

History 
The village was founded by James Badgery, who was born near the County Town of Exeter in Devon, England. He arrived in New South Wales in 1799, and by 1812 was operating ‘Exeter Farms’ near Bringelly. His fortunes prospered and he explored further south arriving in what is now Exeter in 1819. In 1821 Badgery took up a 500-acre land grant on the site of the present village calling the new property Spring Grove. His son Henry continued expansion in the locality and by 1841 there was a flourishing community on the various Badgery properties. Eleven households with 79 people appear on the NSW Census of that year. Their principal property, Vine Lodge, accommodated 33 residents, including 13 convicts and ex-convicts. Following the subdivision of Vine Lodge around 1888, the name of Exeter came into being in 1890 for the present village.

There was a railway accident at Exeter in fog on a single line on 13 March 1914, killing 14 people, when the Temora Mail collided with the locomotive of a goods train which had not completed backing into a siding to allow the Mail train to pass. This is NSW's third worst railway accident.

Population
At the 2021 census, there were 1,087 people living at Exeter.

Heritage listings 
Exeter has a number of heritage-listed sites, including:
 Main Southern railway: Exeter railway station

School
Schools in Exeter:

 Exeter Public School

References

External links
Exeter page on the Southern Highlands district website
Detailed history of the village on the same site

Towns of the Southern Highlands (New South Wales)
Wingecarribee Shire